Brian Humphries CBE is president and CEO of the European Business Aviation Association (EBAA), based in Brussels. He has served separate tenures at EBAA as chairman, president and CEO since 1996. He is also chairman of the British Helicopter Advisory Board and has served a three-year term as chairman of the Montreal-based International Business Aviation Council (IBAC), representing the interests of business aviation globally at ICAO.

Career

Brian Humphries joined Shell Aircraft in late 1989 as an aviation adviser, having served in the Royal Air Force in ranks up to Air Commodore in a variety of appointments with both flying and engineering responsibilities. After becoming managing director of Shell Aircraft Limited in 1994, his duties were expanded in 2000 when he also became the CEO of Shell Aircraft International, accountable for all Shell Aircraft's operations worldwide, amounting to more than 100,000 flying hours per year. Humphries retired from Shell in April-2005.

References

External links
 British Helicopter Advisory Board
 EBAA
 IBAC
 ICAO

Aviation in Europe
Living people
Commanders of the Order of the British Empire
Year of birth missing (living people)